Gross rent multiplier (GRM) is the ratio of the price of a real estate investment to its annual rental income before accounting for expenses such as property taxes, insurance, and utilities; GRM is the number of years the property would take to pay for itself in gross received rent. For a prospective real estate investor, a lower GRM represents a better opportunity.

The GRM is useful for comparing and selecting investment properties where depreciation effects, periodic costs (such as property taxes and insurance) and costs to the investor incurred by a potential renter (such as utilities and repairs) can be expected to be uniform across the properties (either as uniform values or uniform fractions of the gross rental income) or insignificant in comparison to gross rental income. As these costs are also often more difficult to predict than market rental return, the GRM serves as an alternative to a measure of net investment return where such a measure would be difficult to determine.

Example: $200,000 Sale Price / (750 per month rent * 12 months) = 22.22

Today, it is quite common for GRM to be quoted by real estate professionals using annual rents rather than monthly rents. A 100 GRM (monthly rents) = 8.33 GRM (annual rents). An 8.33 GRM calculated on annual rents suggests the gross rent will pay for the property in 8.33 years.

The common measure of rental real estate value based on net return rather than gross rental income is the capitalization rate (or cap rate). In contrast to the GRM, the cap rate is not a multiplier but a rate of annual return. A similar multiplier to the GRM derived from net return would be the multiplicative inverse of the cap rate.

Relationship of the cap rate to the total return
Another way to value property is with the use of a multiple of gross potential rent, which is arrived at by observing multiples at comparable properties that have sold. This is done with the gross rent multiplier (GRM) or a gross income multiplier (GIM), which are essentially the same. When using these, it is important to know whether they were derived from multiples of gross potential rent or rather effective gross income.

Procedures like the above are sometimes called "shortcut" procedures and they certainly have their place but as causal models of asset value they tend to be at best simplistic and at worst incomplete and sometimes misleading, compared to the more complete multiperiod discounted cash flow (DCF) procedure. For example, even though an example property's value of $18,325,000 may be expressed in terms of, a 5.46 percent cap rate, this does not imply that its value is caused simply by investors' wanting an initial income yield of 5.46 percent. Investors should care about a more complete multiperiod total return perspective on their future investment performance, as represented in the DCF procedure.

It is more accurate to think of the longer-term total return total perspective represented by DCF as causing the property value of $18,325,000. The cap rate of 5.46 percent is then best viewed as a reflective representation of the more fundamental DCF calculation.

References

Real estate valuation